Deportivo Guaymallén is an Argentine sports club, which home town is located in Rodeo de La Cruz, Mendoza Province. Although many sports are practised in the club, Guaymallén is mostly known for its football team, which currently plays in the Torneo Argentino B, the regionalised 4th division of Argentine football league system.

Honours
Liga Mendocina de Fútbol (4): 2000, Clausura 2002, 2004, 2005

External links
Official site 

 
Guaymallen
Association football clubs established in 1918
1918 establishments in Argentina